The following is a list of notable deaths in November 2020.

Entries for each day are listed alphabetically by surname. A typical entry lists information in the following sequence:
 Name, age, country of citizenship at birth, subsequent country of citizenship (if applicable), reason for notability, cause of death (if known), and reference.

November 2020

1
Hryhoriy Arshynov, 59, Ukrainian civil engineer and activist, COVID-19.
Carol Arthur, 85, American actress (Blazing Saddles, The Sunshine Boys, Making It), Alzheimer's disease.
Julio Bécquer, 88, Cuban baseball player (Washington Senators, Los Angeles Angels, Minnesota Twins).
Tonny Bruins Slot, 73, Dutch football manager (FC Barcelona, Ajax, Benfica).
Rachel Caine, 58, American novelist, soft-tissue sarcoma.
Chang Yi, 68, Taiwanese film director (Jade Love, Kuei-Mei, a Woman), co-founder of Liuli Gongfang.
Paul Crane, 76, American football player (New York Jets).
Ali El Kenz, 74, Algerian writer and sociologist.
John R. Dunne, 90, American jurist and politician, member of the New York Senate (1966–1989).
Tuomas Gerdt, 98, Finnish military officer, last surviving Mannerheim Cross recipient.
Yalçın Granit, 88, Turkish Olympic basketball player (1952).
Eddie Hassell, 30, American actor (The Kids Are All Right, Surface, Devious Maids), shot.
Keith Hitchins, 89, American historian specialized on Romanian history.
Pedro Iturralde, 91, Spanish saxophonist and composer.
Phil K, 51, Australian DJ (Lostep), bladder cancer.
Dan Kohn, 47, American entrepreneur, founder of NetMarket, complications from colon cancer.
Burhan Kuzu, 65, Turkish politician, MP (2002–2018), COVID-19.
Nikolay Maksyuta, 73, Russian politician, governor of Volgograd Oblast (1997–2010), COVID-19.
Don McDermott, 90, American speed skater, Olympic silver medalist (1952).
Nikki McKibbin, 42, American singer-songwriter and reality show contestant (American Idol), brain aneurysm.
Des Moore, 88, Australian economist.
Jorge Núñez Sánchez, 73, Ecuadorian writer and historian, cancer.
Ronnie Peel, 74, Australian guitarist and singer (Thunderclap Newman, The La De Da's, John Paul Young).
Mario Pereyra, 77, Argentine radio host and businessman, COVID-19.
Stafford Poole, 90, American Catholic priest and research historian.
Enuga Sreenivasulu Reddy, 96, Indian anti-Apartheid activist.
Lady Elizabeth Shakerley, 79, British socialite.
Tinín, 74, Spanish matador.
Billy Tubbs, 85, American basketball coach (Lamar Cardinals, Oklahoma Sooners, TCU Horned Frogs), leukemia.

2
Dietrich Adam, 67, German actor (Mostly Martha, French for Beginners, Storm of Love).
Robert Sam Anson, 75, American journalist and author.
Quincy Armstrong, 91, American football player (Hamilton Tiger-Cats, Cleveland Browns, Ottawa Rough Riders).
Earl Brian, 78, American physician and businessman.
Dorothy Christ, 95, American baseball player (South Bend Blue Sox).
Nancy Darsch, 68, American basketball coach, Olympic champion (1984, 1996), complications from Parkinson's disease.
Léo de Almeida Neves, 88, Brazilian politician, economist and lawyer, deputy (1967–1969, 1983–1987), intestinal problems.
Rajko Đurić, 73, Serbian writer.
Roy Edwards, 66, American politician, member of the Wyoming House of Representatives (since 2015), COVID-19.
David Faulkner, 86, British civil servant and academic.
Peter Goodwright, 84, English impressionist (Who Do You Do?).
Chuck Hartman, 85, American baseball coach (Virginia Tech Hokies).
Ashish Kakkad, 49, Indian film director (Mission Mummy), writer and actor (Kai Po Che!, Vitamin She), heart attack.
T. N. Krishnan, 92, Indian Carnatic violinist.
Ahmed Laraki, 89, Moroccan politician, prime minister (1969–1971).
Euan MacKie, 84, British archaeologist and anthropologist.
Bhagirathi Majhi, 66, Indian politician, MP (2006–2010), COVID-19.
Trevor Malloch, 91, New Zealand cricketer (Wellington).
Oscar W. McConkie Jr., 94, American politician, president of the Utah State Senate (1965–1966), COVID-19.
Raju Mishra, 72, Indian cinematographer (Aranya Rodan, Nirbachana, Joymoti), screenwriter and film director, cardiac arrest.
Park Ji-sun, 35, South Korean comedian and actress.
Gigi Proietti, 80, Italian actor (Febbre da cavallo, Lady Liberty, Brancaleone at the Crusades) and comedian, heart attack.
Rodolfo Rabanal, 80, Argentine writer and journalist, brain cancer.
Elsa Raven, 91, American actress (Back to the Future, Amen, Titanic).
John Sessions, 67, British actor and comedian (Stella Street, Spitting Image, Whose Line Is It Anyway?), heart attack.
Satish Prasad Singh, 84, Indian politician, MP (1980–1984) and chief minister of Bihar (1968), COVID-19.
Karl Sitter, 92, Austrian Olympic rower (1948).
Maria Tsien, 95, American actress.
Max Ward, 98, Canadian aviator, founder of Wardair.
Baron Wolman, 83, American photographer (Rolling Stone), complications from amyotrophic lateral sclerosis.

3
Isaac Alvarez, 90, French actor and mime. 
Anthony Van Dyck, 4, Irish racehorse, euthanised.
Irvin Baxter Jr., 75, American Pentecostal preacher and televangelist, COVID-19.
Henry Brind, 93, British diplomat, ambassador to Somalia (1977–1980) and high commissioner to Malawi (1983–1987).
Gennady Bukharin, 91, Russian sprint canoeist, double World champion (1958).
Blair Campbell, 74, Australian cricketer (Victoria, Tasmania) and footballer (Richmond).
Taymi Chappé, 52, Cuban-Spanish Olympic fencer (1996).
Anne Covell, 70, Canadian Olympic athlete (1968).
Claude Giraud, 84, French actor (Angélique, Marquise des Anges, Circle of Love, The Mad Adventures of Rabbi Jacob).
William Helburn, 96, American photographer.
Dharshibhai Khanpura, 80, Indian politician, Gujarat MLA (1990–2007, 2012–2017), COVID-19.
Matti Laakso, 79, Finnish Olympic wrestler (1960, 1964, 1972).
Faustas Latėnas, 64, Lithuanian composer (My Little Wife, Wooden Staircase).
Seno Nugroho, 48, Indonesian artist and puppeteer, heart attack.
Aileen Passloff, 89, American dancer and choreographer, heart failure.
Jacques Pereira, 65, Portuguese footballer (Braga, Porto, national team), heart failure.
H. G. Somashekar Rao, 86, Indian actor (27 Mavalli Circle, Mithileya Seetheyaru, Koormavatara), cardiac arrest.
Grzegorz Szerszenowicz, 75, Polish footballer (Broń Radom, Jagiellonia Białystok, Mazur Ełk).
Don Talbot, 87, Australian Olympic Hall of Fame swimming coach.

4
Lalit Bhati, 61, Indian politician, COVID-19.
Lakhdar Bouregaa, 87, Algerian independentist militant, COVID-19.
Maurice Faivre, 94, French general and political scientist.
Theodore Friend, 89, American historian, president of Swarthmore College (1973–1982), cancer.
Sead Gološ, 51, Bosnian architect, COVID-19.
Ken Hensley, 75, English singer-songwriter (Uriah Heep, Blackfoot, Toe Fat).
Bruce Hurley, 86, American politician, member of the Tennessee House of Representatives (1971–1989).
Faraaz Khan, 50, Indian actor (Fareb, Mehndi, Achanak 37 Saal Baad), neurological disease.
Benjamin LaGuer, 57, American convicted rapist, liver disease.
Naomi Long Madgett, 97, American poet.
Sergio Matteucci, 89, Italian voice actor and radio presenter.
Tom Metzger, 82, American white supremacist, founder of White Aryan Resistance, Parkinson's disease.
John Meyer, 78, American football player (Houston Oilers) and coach (Green Bay Packers, Boston/New England Patriots), COVID-19.
Adam David Miller, 98, American poet and memoirist.
Moncef Ouannes, 63–64, Tunisian sociologist, COVID-19.
Abdul Rashid, 73, Pakistani field hockey player, Olympic champion (1968).
Shakey Rodriguez, 67, American basketball coach (FIU Panthers), brain aneurysm.
Mariano Francisco Saynez Mendoza, 78, Mexican admiral, secretary of the Navy (2006–2012).
Montinee Tangphong, 35, Thai tennis player, lymphoma.
Matt Tees, 81, Scottish footballer (Grimsby Town, Charlton Athletic, Airdrieonians).
Jean-Pierre Vincent, 78, French theatre actor and director, administrator of the Comédie-Française (1983–1986).
Jan Vrba, 83, Czech politician, minister of industry (1990–1992), COVID-19.
Ernest Westfield, 80, American baseball player (Birmingham Black Barons).
Luis Zapata, 69, Mexican writer.

5
Len Barry, 78, American singer ("1-2-3", "Bristol Stomp"), myelodysplasia.
Yuvensius Alfonsius Biakai, 63, Indonesian politician, regent of Asmat (2005–2015).
Alan Cairns, 80, Northern Irish clergyman and author, COVID-19.
Maggie Crotty, 72, American politician, member of the Illinois Senate (2003–2009).
François d'Harcourt, 91, French politician, Deputy (1973–1997).
Jacques Glowinski, 84, French pharmacist.
David Hawkins, 86, Australian Olympic swimmer.
Jim Marurai, 73, Cook Island politician, prime minister (2004–2010), minister of foreign affairs (2009) and MP (1994–2017).
Barbara McAulay, 91, Australian Olympic diver (1956).
Ouyang Zhongshi, 92, Chinese calligrapher.
Leonid Osipov, 77, Russian water polo player, Olympic champion (1972).
Geoffrey Palmer, 93, British actor (As Time Goes By, Butterflies, The Fall and Rise of Reginald Perrin).
Johnny Paredes, 58, Venezuelan baseball player (Montreal Expos, Detroit Tigers), cancer.
Robert Peterson, 83, Canadian politician, senator (2005–2012).
Janine Puget, 93, French-born Argentine psychiatrist and psychoanalyst.
Jim Ramstad, 74, American politician, member of the Minnesota Senate (1981–1991) and U.S. House of Representatives (1991–2009), Parkinson's disease.
Reynaert, 65, Belgian singer ("Laissez briller le soleil"), COVID-19.
Joseph Rishel, 80, American art curator, complications from Parkinson's disease.
Ossi Runne, 93, Finnish trumpeter, orchestra leader and composer ("Playboy").
Rex Rector, 69, American politician, member of the Missouri House of Representatives (2001–2007).
Nissim Sharim, 88, Chilean actor and theater director (Julio comienza en julio, Ufa con el sexo).
Pierre Simonet, 99, French militant and international civil servant.
Géza Szőcs, 67, Romanian-Hungarian poet and politician, secretary of state for culture (2010–2012), COVID-19.
Govardhan Upadhyay, 77, Indian politician, Madhya Pradesh MLA (1985–1990, 2013–2018).
Gordon Van Wylen, 100, American physicist and academic administrator, president of Hope College (1972–1987), COVID-19.
Joy Westmore, 88, Australian actress (Prisoner, Neighbours, Blue Heelers).

6
Caprino Alendy, 68, Surinamese politician, MP (1991–2010).
Giuseppe Amadei, 101, Italian politician, Deputy (1958–1987).
Luis Alberto Ammann, 77, Argentine politician, Secretary-General of the Humanist Party (1984–1994, 2001–2003), complications from COVID-19.
Mick Barry, 77, Australian rugby union player (national team), drowned.
Jean-Michel Boris, 87, French artistic director, Director General of the Olympia (1979–2001).
Paul Carey, 41, Irish hurler, traffic collision.
Patrick Chokala, 72, Tanzanian diplomat, Ambassador to Russia (2002–2004), heart attack.
Ray Daviault, 86, Canadian baseball player (New York Mets).
Dovid Feinstein, 91, Belarusian-born American Orthodox rabbi, rosh yeshiva of the Mesivtha Tifereth Jerusalem (since 1986).
Gene Felton, 84, American racecar driver, emphysema.
June Foulds, 86, British athlete, Olympic silver (1956) and bronze medalist (1952).
Jean-Michel Goudard, 80, French public relations executive (BBDO).
Harry Holman, 62, English footballer (Exeter City, Peterborough United).
King Von, 26, American rapper, shot.
Mluleki Ndobe, 46, South African politician, member of the KwaZulu-Natal Legislature (since 2019), suicide by gunshot.
Jim Neilson, 78, Canadian ice hockey player (New York Rangers).
Andrzej Owczarek, 70, Polish politician and teacher, mayor of Łask (1990–1998), member of Senate (2005–2015), COVID-19.
Sergey Palagin, 52, Russian military pilot and lieutenant colonel, complications from COVID-19.
Jim Radford, 92, English folk singer-songwriter and peace activist, COVID-19.
Luke Rhinehart, 87, American author (The Dice Man).
Les Rohr, 74, British-born American baseball player (New York Mets).
Timur Selçuk, 74, Turkish singer, pianist and composer ("Bana Bana").
Bernard Sesé, 91, French academic, essayist, poet, and translator.
Piero Simondo, 92, Italian artist.
Shelby Smith, 93, American politician.
Fernando Solanas, 84, Argentine film director (The Hour of the Furnaces, Tangos, the Exile of Gardel, Social Genocide) and politician, Senator (2013–2019), COVID-19.
Ken Spears, 82, American animator and television producer (Scooby-Doo, Dynomutt, Dog Wonder, Alvin and the Chipmunks), complications from Lewy body dementia.
Gerald Stone, 87, American-born Australian television producer (60 Minutes) and journalist.
Constantin Dan Vasiliu, 69, Romanian politician, senator (1992–2004).
Oliver Winterbottom, 76, British automotive designer.
Nathan Zach, 89, Israeli poet.
Mikhail Zhvanetsky, 86, Ukrainian-Russian writer and satirist, People's Artist of Russia (2012).

7
Adrian Cahill, 49, Irish hurler (Offaly).
Cándido Camero, 99, Cuban jazz percussionist.
Chung Laung Liu, 86, Chinese-born Taiwanese computer scientist.
Cyril Colbeau-Justin, 50, French film producer (Me, Myself and Mum, The Last Deadly Mission), cancer.
Norm Crosby, 93, American comedian and actor (Eight Crazy Nights).
John Fraser, 89, Scottish actor (The Good Companions, The Trials of Oscar Wilde, Repulsion), cancer.
Vasile Gherasim, 70, Romanian politician, mayor of Sector 1 (2000–2004) and deputy (2008–2012), COVID-19.
Edwin Gilbert, 91, American swimmer.
Abdelkader Guerroudj, 92, Algerian political activist.
Henry Haller, 97, Swiss-American chef, White House Executive Chef (1966–1987).
Bones Hillman, 62, New Zealand bassist (Midnight Oil, The Swingers, Suburban Reptiles), cancer.
Fred Hills, 85, American literary editor, complications from prostate cancer.
Hou Feng, 92, Chinese plant breeding engineer, member of the Chinese Academy of Engineering.
Pierre Lataillade, 87, French politician, mayor of Arcachon (1985–2001).
Jeanne Little, 82, Australian entertainer (The Mike Walsh Show, Cuckoo in the Nest, Beauty and the Beast).
Rina Macrelli, 91, Italian screenwriter and essayist.
Jean Maissant, 94, French Olympic discus thrower (1952).
Mike McCormack, 98, American politician, member of the U.S. House of Representatives (1971–1981), Washington House of Representatives (1957–1961) and Senate (1961–1970).
Jean-Marie Mérigoux, 82, French Roman Catholic priest.
Sakari Paasonen, 85, Finnish Olympic shooter (1988, 1992).
Edward J. Perkins, 92, American diplomat, ambassador to the United Nations, South Africa and Liberia.
Jonathan Sacks, Baron Sacks, 72, British Orthodox rabbi, chief rabbi of the United Synagogue (1991–2013) and member of the House of Lords (since 2013), cancer.
Moustafa Safouan, 99, Egyptian psychoanalyst.
Anicetus Bongsu Antonius Sinaga, 79, Indonesian Roman Catholic prelate, archbishop of Medan (2009–2018), COVID-19.
Willie Smith, 64, American sprinter, Olympic champion (1984).
Song Jae-ho, 83, South Korean actor (Yeong-ja's Heydays, Memories of Murder, The President's Last Bang).
Anatoly Mikhailovich Stepin, 80, Russian mathematician.
Sir Philip Wroughton, 86, British businessman and public servant, Lord Lieutenant of Berkshire (1995–2008).
Yang Zhenduo, 94, Chinese martial artist.
Vera Zima, 67, Croatian actress (Love Letters with Intent, Cashier Wants to Go to the Seaside, Sorry for Kung Fu).

8
Joseph Altairac, 63, French literary critic and essayist.
Mohammed Bakar, 75, Malaysian Olympic football player (1972), (Penang FA, national team) and manager, bone marrow failure.
Oscar Benton, 71, Dutch vocalist ("Bensonhurst Blues").
Herman Daled, 90, Belgian art collector.
Horst David, 81, German serial killer.
Paul Foshee, 88, American politician.
Clive Griffiths, 91, Australian politician, president (1977–1997) and member (1965–1997) of the Western Australian Legislative Council.
Raphael Hadane, 97, Ethiopian-Israeli religious leader, kahen of Beta Israel.
Cliff Joseph, 98, Panama-born American artist. 
Sanchaman Limboo, 73, Indian politician, chief minister of Sikkim (1994).
Howie Meeker, 97, Canadian Hall of Fame ice hockey player (Toronto Maple Leafs), commentator (HNIC) and politician, MP (1951–1953), four-time Stanley Cup champion.
Marc Metdepenningen, 62, Belgian journalist.
Stéphane Moulin, 57, French football referee.
Chuck Mrazovich, 96, American basketball player (Anderson Packers, Indianapolis Olympians).
Jean-Yves Nau, 68, French physician and scientific journalist.
Richard Neely, 79, American jurist, justice of the Supreme Court of Appeals of West Virginia (1973–1995), liver cancer.
Bernard L. Shaw, 90, English chemist.
Heidar Shonjani, 74, Iranian Olympic swimmer (1964) and water polo player (1976).
Ataullah Siddiqui, 66, Indian-born British scholar of Islam, cancer.
Miro Steržaj, 87, Slovene nine-pin bowler, businessman and politician, mayor of Ljutomer (1988–1992).
Seymour Topping, 98, American journalist (The New York Times), stroke.
Alex Trebek, 80, Canadian-American game show host (Jeopardy!, High Rollers, Classic Concentration), seven-time Emmy winner, pancreatic cancer.
Víctor Valencia de los Santos, 61, Mexican politician, deputy (2006–2008), COVID-19.
Carlos G. Vallés, 95, Spanish-Indian Jesuit priest and author.
Vanusa, 73, Brazilian singer.
Jeff Watson, 47, Canadian game designer and academic, cancer.
Andrzej Wawrzyniak, 88, Polish diplomat and art collector.

9
Fernando Atzori, 78, Italian boxer, Olympic champion (1964).
Bruno Barbey, 79, Moroccan-born French photographer.
Virginia Bonci, 71, Romanian Olympic athlete (1968).
Pierre Candelo, 86, French Olympic sport shooter.
Foster Castleman, 89, American baseball player (New York Giants, Baltimore Orioles).
Daryono, 26, Indonesian footballer (Persija Jakarta, Badak Lampung), dengue fever.
Charles M. Eastman, 80, American architect.
Glenn Ezell, 76, American baseball executive (Detroit Tigers) and coach (Texas Rangers, Kansas City Royals).
W. D. Ariyasinghe, 64, Sri Lankan musician.
Domènec Fita i Molat, 93, Spanish painter and sculptor.
Charles-Henri Flammarion, 74, French literary editor.
Tom Heinsohn, 86, American Hall of Fame basketball player, coach, and broadcaster (Boston Celtics), NBA Champion (1957, 1959–1965, 1974, 1976).
Israel Horovitz, 81, American playwright and screenwriter (Author! Author!, Sunshine, James Dean).
Harry R. Jackson Jr., 67, American Christian preacher and Pentecostal bishop.
Gordon Joseloff, 75, American journalist (CBS News), myelofibrosis.
John Kinsela, 70, Australian Olympic wrestler (1968, 1972).
Robert Layton, 90, English musicologist and music critic.
Lawrence LeShan, 100, American psychologist, educator and author.
Lê Dinh, 86, Vietnamese-Canadian songwriter.
Edward McClain, 80, American politician, member of the Alabama Senate (1995–2009).
C. Moyinkutty, 77, Indian politician, Kerala MLA (1996–2016), liver disease.
Dan Pfister, 83, American baseball player (Kansas City Athletics). 
Marco Santagata, 73, Italian writer and academic, COVID-19.
Eleanor Schano, 88, American journalist, COVID-19.
Howard P. Segal, 72, American historian of technology.
Amadou Toumani Touré, 72, Malian politician, president (1991–1992, 2002–2012).
Shkëlqim Troplini, 54, Albanian Olympic wrestler (1996), COVID-19.
William G. T. Tuttle Jr., 84, American general.
Doug Wragg, 86, English footballer (Rochdale, West Ham United, Mansfield Town).
Basil Yamey, 101, South African economist.
Daniel Yonnet, 87, French journalist and literary critic.

10
Nagima Aitkhozhina, 74, Kazakh biologist.
Hanane Al-Barassi, 46, Libyan anti-corruption and women's rights activist, shot.
Alec Baillie, American bassist (Choking Victim, Leftöver Crack).
Carlo Bordini, 82, Italian poet.
Charles Corver, 84, Dutch football referee.
Graham Cowdrey, 56, English cricketer (Kent).
Dino da Costa, 89, Brazilian-born Italian footballer (Botafogo, Roma, Italy national team).
Jerzy Derkacz, 70, Polish politician, senator (1993–1997).
DJ Spinbad, 46, American DJ (WHTZ) and record producer.
Harold Edwards, 84, American mathematician, colon cancer.
Saeb Erekat, 65, Palestinian politician and diplomat (Oslo Accords), MP (since 1996) and secretary-general of the PLO (since 2015), COVID-19.
Renzo Gattegna, 81, Italian lawyer, president of the Union of Italian Jewish Communities (2006–2016), COVID-19.
Vladimir Găitan, 73, Romanian actor (The Reenactment, Accident, Uncle Marin, the Billionaire), cancer.
Sen-itiroh Hakomori, 91, Japanese-American biochemist.
Bob Hantla, 89, American football player (San Francisco 49ers, BC Lions).
Luis Ibero, 71, Spanish politician, COVID-19.
Bede Lackner, 92, Hungarian-American priest and monk.
Igor Moskvin, 91, Russian figure skating coach.
Ba Ag Moussa, Malian militant and jihadist, shot.
Günther Pfaff, 81, Austrian canoeist, Olympic bronze medalist (1968).
Isidro Pedraza Chávez, 61, Mexican politician, senator (2006–2009, 2012–2015), COVID-19.
Mahadeepak Singh Shakya, 98, Indian politician, MP (1977–1998).
Juan Sol, 73, Spanish footballer (Valencia, Real Madrid, national team). 
Mila del Sol, 97, Filipino actress (Giliw Ko, Ibong Adarna).
Rahayu Supanggah, 71, Indonesian composer.
Russell T. Thane, 94, American politician.
Tony Waiters, 83, English football player (Blackpool, national team) and manager (Plymouth Argyle).
Mike Whorf, 88, American radio personality.
Sven Wollter, 86, Swedish actor (The Sacrifice, The Man on the Roof, A Song for Martin), COVID-19.
Amir Yavari, 88, Iranian Olympic boxer (1960).
Mahmoud Yavari, 81, Iranian football player (PAS Tehran, national team) and manager (Tractor).

11
Mongameli Bobani, 52, South African politician, mayor of Nelson Mandela Bay (2018–2019), COVID-19.
Carlos Campos, 83, Chilean footballer (Universidad de Chile, national team), respiratory failure.
Shegufta Bakht Chaudhuri, 86, Bangladeshi economist, governor of Bangladesh Bank (1987–1992).
Francesc-Xavier Ciuraneta Aymí, 80, Spanish Roman Catholic prelate, bishop of Menorca (1991–1999) and Lleida (1999–2007).
Justin Cronin, 40, American politician, member of the South Dakota House of Representatives (2009–2019).
Jean Collet, 88, French writer.
Marian Cooksey, 77, American politician.
Titus Davis, 27, American football player (Central Michigan Chippewas), renal medullary carcinoma.
Charles DeJurnett, 68, American football player (San Diego Chargers, Los Angeles Rams), cancer.
Edward Flak, 72, Polish lawyer and German minority politician, mayor of Olesno (1990–1994, 1998–2006), member of the Sejm (1992–1993).
Juan Gómez-Quiñones, 80, Mexican-born American historian.
Dame Margaret Guilfoyle, 94, Northern Irish-born Australian politician, senator (1971–1987), minister for finance (1980–1983) and social security (1975–1980).
Edmund Jagiełło, 73, Polish physician and politician, member of the Sejm (1989–1991), senator (1991–1993).
*Khalifa bin Salman Al Khalifa, 84, Bahraini royal and politician, prime minister (since 1970).
Valentin Khromov, 86, Russian poet.
Mark Kosmos, 75, American football player (Ottawa Rough Riders).
Mileta Lisica, 54, Serbian-Slovene basketball player (Sloboda Tuzla, Crvena zvezda, Pivovarna Laško).
Jorge Llopart, 68, Spanish race walker, Olympic silver medallist (1980), heart attack.
Robert Lue, 56, Jamaican biologist, cancer.
Thembekile Kimi Makwetu, 54, South African accountant, auditor-general (since 2013), lung cancer.
André Martin, 91, French particle physicist.
Les Massie, 85, Scottish footballer (Huddersfield Town).
Giuliana Minuzzo, 88, Italian alpine skier, Olympic bronze medallist (1952, 1960).
MO3, 28, American rapper, shot.
Michel Mongeau, 74, Canadian actor (How My Mother Gave Birth to Me During Menopause, Gaz Bar Blues, Shake Hands with the Devil).
Reg Morelli, 84, American-Canadian ice hockey player (North Dakota Fighting Hawks).
Abdulkadir Balarabe Musa, 84, Nigerian politician, governor of Kaduna State (1979–1981).
Netatua Pelesikoti, Tongan environmentalist.
Jude Stéfan, 90, French poet.
Theresa Stewart, 90, English politician, Lord Mayor of Birmingham (2000–2001).
Mark Stockman, 73, Ukrainian-born American physicist.
Gonçalo Ribeiro Telles, 98, Portuguese landscape architect and politician, co-founder of the People's Monarchist Party and the Earth Party.
Faye Urban, 75, Canadian tennis player.
Marie-Claude Vayssade, 84, French politician, MEP (1979–1994).
Andrew White, 78, American jazz saxophonist and musicologist.

12
Asif Basra, 53, Indian actor (Outsourced, One Night with the King, Once Upon a Time in Mumbaai), suicide by hanging.
William T. Beaver, 87, American medical researcher and educator, complications of COVID-19.
Wolfgang Engelmann, 78, German politician, MP (1990–1998).
Walter J. Gex III, 81, American jurist, judge of the U.S. District Court for Southern Mississippi (since 1986).
Alan Glazier, 81, English darts player.
Boris Gurevich, 83, Ukrainian wrestler, Olympic champion (1968).
Michael Z. Hobson, 83, American comic book publisher (Marvel Comics).
Kanybek Isakov, 51, Kyrgyz politician and academic, COVID-19.
Surendra Singh Jeena, 50, Indian politician, Uttarakhand MLA (since 2007), COVID-19.
Nelly Kaplan, 89, Argentine-born French film director (A Very Curious Girl) and screenwriter, COVID-19.
Lynn Kellogg, 77, American singer and actress (Hair, Charro!), COVID-19.
Masatoshi Koshiba, 94, Japanese physicist, Nobel Prize laureate (2002).
Jacob M. Landau, 96, Israeli political scientist.
Villem Lüüs, 49, Estonian draughts player and judge.
Tibor Méray, 96, Hungarian journalist and writer (Catch Me a Spy).
Jack Michael, 94, American psychologist.
Marc Monchal, 85, French army general.
John Outterbridge, 87, American sculptor and activist.
Piem, 97, French designer.
Leonid Potapov, 85, Russian politician, president of Buryatia (1994–2007), COVID-19.
Arjun Prajapati, 63, Indian pottery artist, Padma Shri (2010), COVID-19.
Dave Quall, 84, American politician, member of the Washington House of Representatives (1993–2011).
Albert Quixall, 87, English footballer (Sheffield Wednesday, Manchester United, national team).
Jerry Rawlings, 73, Ghanaian politician, president (1979, 1981–2001), COVID-19.
Gernot Roll, 81, German cinematographer (The Last Escape, Zero Hour, Beyond Silence) and film director.
Krasnodar Rora, 75, Croatian football player (Dinamo Zagreb, Yugoslavia national team) and manager (NK Radnik Velika Gorica).
Paul Schrieber, 54, American baseball umpire, brain hemorrhage.
Guy-Olivier Segond, 75, Swiss politician, member of the swiss national council (1987–1990).
Waqar Ahmed Seth, 59, Pakistani jurist, justice (since 2011) and chief justice (since 2018) of the Peshawar High Court, COVID-19.
Quentin Smith, 68, American philosopher.
Aldo Tambellini, 90, Italian-American artist, complications from surgery.
Sakata Tōjūrō IV, 88, Japanese kabuki actor.
Howie Winter, 91, American mobster (Winter Hill Gang), heart attack.

13
Mohammad Ali, 76, Bangladeshi politician, MP (1996–2001).
Thomas J. Allen, 89, American organizational theorist.
Vidin Apostolov, 79, Bulgarian footballer (Lokomotiv Sofia, Botev Plovdiv, national team).
Eliza Jane Ashley, 103, American chef and author.
Ravi Belagere, 62, Indian journalist (Hai Bangalore, O Manase), heart attack.
Robert Byron Bird, 96, American chemical engineer.
Rik Boel, 89, Belgian politician and judge, minister of the interior (1977–1979).
João Cunha, 81, Brazilian politician, deputy (1975–1991).
Terry Duerod, 64, American basketball player (Boston Celtics, Detroit Pistons, Dallas Mavericks), NBA champion (1981), leukemia.
József Halzl, 86, Hungarian mechanical engineer, co-founder of the Hungarian Democratic Forum and CEO of MVM Group (1991–1994).
Mohand Chérif Hannachi, 70, Algerian football player (national team) and executive.
John Hays, 71, British travel agency executive, founder of Hays Travel.
Noah Hershkowitz, 79, American physicist.
Paul Hornung, 84, American Hall of Fame football player (Green Bay Packers), Super Bowl champion (1966), Heisman Trophy winner (1956), complications from dementia.
Attila Horváth, 53, Hungarian Olympic discus thrower (1992, 1996), COVID-19.
Konrad Hünteler, 73, German flutist.
Abiola Félix Iroko, 73–74, Beninese historian and university professor.
Roger Jepsen, 91, American politician, member of the U.S. Senate (1979–1985) and Iowa Senate (1966–1968), Lt. Governor of Iowa (1969–1973).
Kjartan Jóhannsson, 80, Icelandic diplomat and politician, minister of fisheries (1978–1980) and of commerce (1979–1980).
Gwyn Jones, 85, Welsh footballer (Wolverhampton Wanderers, Bristol Rovers).
Jay Kerttula, 92, American politician, member (1961–1963, 1965–1973) and speaker (1969–1971) of the Alaska House of Representatives, member (1973–1995) and president (1981–1985) of the Alaska Senate.
Jam Madad Ali Khan, 57, Pakistani politician, Sindh MPA (since 2008), COVID-19.
Akira Kubodera, 43, Japanese actor (Pretty Guardian Sailor Moon, Kamen Rider Blade, Kamen Rider Kiva), suicide.
Halina Kwiatkowska, 99, Polish actress (Ashes and Diamonds, The Doll, And Along Come Tourists).
Pierre Mercier, 83, Canadian politician.
Walter C. Miller, 94, American television producer (Grammy Awards).
Jean Morzadec, 67, French singer-songwriter and media director.
Alfred Muller, 79, French politician, deputy (1993–1997) and mayor of Schiltigheim (1977–2008).
Jim Pace, 59, American racing driver, complications of COVID-19.
Pat Pariseau, 84, American politician, complications from dementia.
Louis Rostollan, 84, French racing cyclist.
Andrzej Prawda, 69, Polish football manager (Victoria Sulejówek, Odra Opole), COVID-19.
Kićo Slabinac, 76, Croatian pop singer ("Tvoj dječak je tužan").
Henry Slaughter, 93, American gospel pianist, complications from COVID-19.
Doug Supernaw, 60, American country musician ("I Don't Call Him Daddy", "Reno", "Not Enough Hours in the Night"), lung and bladder cancer.
Peter Sutcliffe, 74, English serial killer, complications of COVID-19.
Vladimír Székely, 79, Hungarian electrical engineer.
Sir John Meurig Thomas, 87, Welsh chemist and academic administrator, Director of the Royal Institution (1986–1991).
Jan van Toorn, 88, Dutch graphic designer.
Julio Videla, 76, Chilean radio and television presenter.
Philip Voss, 84, British actor (Vicious, Doctor Who, Fish), cancer and COVID-19.
Made Wianta, 70, Indonesian painter.
Günther Wirth, 87, German footballer.

14
Jay E. Adams, 91, American religious author, founder of Nouthetic counseling.
Osmo Ala-Honkola, 81, Finnish Olympic shooter (1968, 1972).
Robert Brown, 85, American politician.
Adolfo Bolea, 87, Spanish football player (Sant Andreu, Tenerife, Cádiz) and manager.
Sydney Chandrasekara, 61, Sri Lankan journalist.
Lamin N. Dibba, Gambian politician.
Gerald Nicholas Dino, 80, American Ruthenian Greek Catholic hierarch, eparch of the Holy Protection of Mary of Phoenix (2008–2016).
Armen Dzhigarkhanyan, 85, Armenian-Russian actor (The New Adventures of the Elusive Avengers, The Crown of the Russian Empire, The Meeting Place Cannot Be Changed).
Peter Florjančič, 101, Slovenian inventor.
Jacques Fornier, 94, French theatrical actor and director.
Barbara Granlund, 92, American politician.
Max Gros-Louis, 89, Canadian politician, grand chief of the Huron-Wendat Nation (1964–1984, 1994–2008).
Greg Growden, 60, Australian sports journalist and author, cancer.
János Gróz, 49, Hungarian handball and beach handball coach, COVID-19.
Charlie Hauck, 79, American television producer and writer (The Hogan Family, Maude, Frasier), pancreatic cancer.
James Haynes, 60, American football player (New Orleans Saints).
Abu Hena, Bangladeshi politician, MP (1996–2006), COVID-19.
Maria Kalinowska, 75, Polish filmgoer.
Lindy McDaniel, 84, American baseball player (St. Louis Cardinals, New York Yankees, Chicago Cubs), COVID-19.
Hasan Muratović, 80, Bosnian politician, prime minister (1996–1997) and minister of foreign trade (1997–1999), COVID-19.
Rae Norman, 62, American actress (The Young and the Restless).
Des O'Connor, 88, English television presenter (The Des O'Connor Show, Des O'Connor Tonight), comedian and singer ("I Pretend"), complications from a fall.
Peter Pagé, 81, German computer scientist.
Kailash Sarang, 85, Indian politician, MP.
Terry A. Simmons, 74, Canadian-American lawyer and environmental activist.
David Stoddart, Baron Stoddart of Swindon, 94, British politician, MP (1970–1983) and member of the House of Lords (since 1983).
William Thomas Jr., 73, American actor (Frank's Place, The Cosby Show).
António Valverde Martins, 85, Portuguese politician and trade unionist, Deputy (1978).
Kay Wiestål, 80, Swedish entrepreneur (Victoria Day) and footballer (Djurgårdens IF), COVID-19.

15
Mahjoubi Aherdane, 99, Moroccan politician.
Carlos Amadeu, 55, Brazilian football player (Bahia) and manager (Vitória, Al Hilal), heart attack.
Frank Butler, 92, American businessman, founder of Catalina Yachts.
Chandrawati, 92, Indian politician, MP (1977–1979), COVID-19.
Soumitra Chatterjee, 85, Indian actor (The World of Apu, Abhijan, Rupkatha Noy), complications from COVID-19.
Ray Clemence, 72, English footballer (Liverpool, Tottenham Hotspur, national team), prostate cancer.
Henrique Córdova, 81, Brazilian politician, governor of Santa Catarina (1982–1983), complications from COVID-19.
Egidio Cosentino, 93, Italian Olympic field hockey player (1952).
Drew S. Days III, 79, American lawyer and academic, U.S. Solicitor General (1993–1996).
Cecil Duckworth, 83, British businessman and charity executive.
Campbell Forsyth, 86, Scottish footballer (St. Mirren, Kilmarnock).
Mary Fowkes, 66, American physician and neuropathologist, heart attack.
Yairus Gwijangge, 51, Indonesian politician, regent of Nduga (since 2011).
Chris Hurford, 89, Australian politician, minister for immigration (1984–1987) and MP (1969–1987).
Rudolf Kippenhahn, 94, German astrophysicist.
Richard Kosolapov, 90, Russian social philosopher and journalist.
Anto Kovačević, 68, Croatian politician, MP (2000–2003), COVID-19.
Ivan Kožarić, 99, Croatian artist.
Leon Claire Metz, 90, American cultural historian, complications from COVID-19.
Kyle Morrell, 57, American football player (Minnesota Vikings), complications from amyotrophic lateral sclerosis.
Fred Morrison, 94, American football player (Chicago Bears, Cleveland Browns), complications from a broken hip.
Victor Popa, 71, Moldovan jurist and politician, deputy (2010–2013) and justice of the Constitutional Court (since 2013).
Anne Rasa, 80, British-South African ethologist. 
Jacques Rifflet, 91, Belgian writer and political scientist.
Witold Sadowy, 100, Polish actor (Zakazane piosenki, Bad Luck).
Mohammad Sozib, 21, Bangladeshi cricketer (Shinepukur), suicide.
Anthony Stewart, 50, American basketball coach (UT Martin Skyhawks).
Ioannis Tassias, 62, Greek Orthodox metropolitan, COVID-19.
Norman Taylor, 55, American-born Australian basketball player (Illawarra Hawks), heart attack.
Ivan Vandor, 88, Italian composer (The Passenger, Django Kill... If You Live, Shoot!) and musician (Musica Elettronica Viva). 
Raúl Eduardo Vela Chiriboga, 86, Ecuadorian Roman Catholic cardinal, bishop of Azogues (1975–1989), military ordinary of Ecuador (1989–2003) and archbishop of Quito (2003–2010).
Marvin Zonis, 84, American political economist.

16
Shawkat Ali, 83, Bangladeshi politician, MP (1979–1986, 1991–2014).
Lanie Black, 73, American politician, member of the Missouri House of Representatives (1998–2006).
Dairon Blanco, 28, Cuban footballer (Las Tunas, national team), traffic collision.
Eddie Borysewicz, 81, Polish-American cycling coach, complications of COVID-19.
Jim Bradford, 87, American politician.
David Carter, 92, British industrial designer.
Raul del Mar, 79, Filipino politician, member (1987–1998, 2001–2010, since 2013) and deputy speaker (2004–2010) of the House of Representatives.
Ian Finkel, 72, American musician, author and entertainer, complications from COVID-19.
Rick Fraser, 66, Canadian ice hockey player (Indianapolis Racers), cancer.
Antonis Georgiadis, 87, Greek football manager (AEK Athens, Olympiacos, national team).
Henryk Gulbinowicz, 97, Polish Roman Catholic cardinal, archbishop of Wrocław (1976–2004).
Eric Hall, 73, English football and music agent, COVID-19.
David Hemblen, 79, English-born Canadian actor (X-Men: The Animated Series, The Sweet Hereafter, Tommy Boy).
Georg Kandlinger, 71, German Olympic cross-country skier.
Alfred Laureta, 96, American jurist, judge of the District Court for the Northern Mariana Islands (1978–1988).
Bhanwarlal Meghwal, 72, Indian politician, Rajasthan MLA (since 2018), brain haemorrhage.
Tomislav Merčep, 68, Croatian politician, convicted war criminal and paramilitary, founder of the Croatian Popular Party.
Bill Morgan, 80, Australian-born Canadian journalist and television producer (CBC News).
Walid Muallem, 79, Syrian diplomat, minister of foreign affairs (since 2006), deputy prime minister (since 2012) and ambassador to the United States (1990–2000).
Sheila Nelson, 84, English string teacher.
John Nurser, 91, English priest and theologian.
Tulsi Ram, 76, Indian politician, Himachal Pradesh MLA (1990–1993, 1998–2003, 2007–2012), kidney disease.
Eugenia Ratti, 87, Italian operatic soprano.
William F. Riordan, 79, American lawyer and jurist, justice (1981–1986) and chief justice (1986) of the New Mexico Supreme Court.
Bruce Swedien, 86, American audio engineer and producer, Grammy winner (1983, 1987, 1990, 1992, 1996).
Harry van Raaij, 84, Dutch football executive, chairman of PSV Eindhoven (1996–2004).
Clark Williams, 78, American politician, member of the North Dakota House of Representatives (1983–1987, 2001–2015).
Art Wolff, 82, American television director (Seinfeld, The Tracey Ullman Show, Grand) and acting coach, heart failure.

17
Camille Bonnet, 102, French rugby union player (SU Agen Lot-et-Garonne, Sporting Club Graulhetois), COVID-19.
Angelo Caroli, 83, Italian footballer (Juventus, Catania, Lucchese) and journalist.
Malcolm CasSelle, 50, American businessman.
William A. Clemens Jr., 88, American paleontologist.
Alokeranjan Dasgupta, 87, Indian poet.
Walt Davis, 89, American basketball player (Philadelphia Warriors, St. Louis Hawks) and high jumper, Olympic champion (1952).
Pim Doesburg, 77, Dutch footballer (Feyenoord, PSV Eindhoven, Sparta Rotterdam).
Stanisław Dulias, 81, Polish politician and economist, deputy (2001–2005), COVID-19.
Gordon Keith, 81, American record producer.
Willy Kuijpers, 83, Belgian politician, MP (1971–1984), MEP (1984–1989), senator (1989–1995), mayor of Herent (1995–2012), COVID-19.
Kay Morley, 100, American actress (Campus Honeymoon, Six-Gun Serenade, Trails End).
Eitaro Okano, 90, Japanese Olympic sprinter (1952), subarachnoid hemorrhage.
Napane Pemasiri Thero, 98, Sri Lankan Buddhist clergy, maha nayaka of Rāmañña Nikāya (since 2012).
Manis Muka Mohd Darah, 66, Malaysian politician, member of Sabah State Legislative Assembly (since 2018).
John Poole, 87, English footballer (Port Vale, Macclesfield Town).
Jean-Ernest Ramez, 88, French Olympic fencer (1964, 1968).
Vincent Reffet, 36, French BASE jumper, wingsuit flyer and jetpack pilot, training accident.
Anneliese Schuh-Proxauf, 98, Austrian Olympic skier (1948).
Anjum Singh, 53, Indian artist, cancer.
Jagmohan Singh, 88, Indian Olympic hurdler (1960), heart attack.
Paul Sobol, 94, Belgian Holocaust survivor and educator.
Sheldon Solow, 92, American real estate developer, lymphoma.
Roman Viktyuk, 84, Russian theater director, People's Artist of Ukraine (2006) and Russia (2009), complications from COVID-19.
Audrey Walker, 92, British textile artist.

18
Thore Göran Andersson, 81, Swedish Olympic sailor (1960).
Claire Boudreau, 55, Canadian genealogist, historian, and chief herald of Canada (2007–2020), cancer.
Iwannis Louis Awad, 86, Syrian Syriac Catholic hierarch, apostolic exarch of Venezuela (2003–2011).
Mel Brez, 84, American television writer (The Doctors, As the World Turns, Days of Our Lives), complications from Parkinson's disease.
George Carter, 74, American basketball player (Detroit Pistons, Virginia Squires, New York Nets).
Rex Downing, 95, American actor (Wuthering Heights, Mandrake the Magician, Blood and Sand).
Alexander Dubyanskiy, 79, Russian Tamil scholar, COVID-19.
Umar Ghalib, 90, Somali politician, prime minister (1991–1993) and minister of foreign affairs (1969–1976).
Mokhtar Hashim, 78, Malaysian politician, minister of culture (1981–1983) and youth and sports (1981–1983).
Tony Hooper, 81, English guitarist (Strawbs).
Arthur Imperatore Sr., 95, American transportation executive and hockey team owner (Colorado Rockies), founder of the NY Waterway.
Leonard Kamsler, 85, American golf photographer, organ failure.
Christine Barkhuizen le Roux, 61, South African writer.
Draga Olteanu Matei, 87, Romanian actress (The Famous Paparazzo, Uncle Marin, the Billionaire, Explosion), gastrointestinal hemorrhage.
Kirby Morrow, 47, Canadian voice actor (Dragon Ball Z, Inuyasha, Ninjago), complications from substance abuse.
Adam Musiał, 71, Polish football player (Wisła Kraków, national team) and manager (Stal Stalowa Wola).
Michel Robin, 90, French actor (Farewell, My Queen, The Triplets of Belleville, Just a Breath Away), COVID-19.
Marguerite Ray, 89, American actress (The Young and the Restless, Sanford and Son).
Juan Roldán, 63, Argentine middleweight boxer, COVID-19.
Esko Silvennoinen, 89, Finnish Olympic field hockey player (1952).
Mridula Sinha, 77, Indian politician, governor of Goa (2014–2019).
Firsat Sofi, 42, Iraqi politician, governor of Erbil (since 2019), COVID-19.
Janusz Turowski, 93, Polish electrical engineer, deputy rector of Lodz University of Technology (1990–1996).
James Wasserman, 72, American author.

19
Michael J. Budds, 73, American musicologist.
Sebouh Chouldjian, 61, Turkish-born Armenian Apostolic prelate, archbishop of Gougark (since 1996), COVID-19.
Ted Carpenter, 68, American politician, member of the Arizona House of Representatives (1999–2007).
Manvel Grigoryan, 64, Armenian military officer and politician, deputy (2012–2018).
Digamber Hansda, 81, Indian Santhali linguist and tribal rights advocate.
Hwawei Ko, 68, Taiwanese pedagogue and professor.
Reşit Karabacak, 66, Turkish Olympic wrestler (1984), COVID-19.
Charles Levin, 94, American jurist, justice of the Michigan Supreme Court (1973–1996).
Helen Morgan, 54, Welsh field hockey player, Olympic bronze medallist (1992), cancer.
Ramsay G. Najjar, 68, Lebanese business executive and writer, complications from COVID-19.
Dumitru Noroc, 87, Moldovan doctor and politician, deputy (1990–1994).
Henry Ward Oxendine, 80, American politician.
Hayford Peirce, 78, American science fiction author, suicide by gunshot.
Roger J. Phillips, 80, American geophysicist, complications from Parkinson's disease.
Alcino Pinto, 64, São Toméan politician, president of the National Assembly (2012–2014).
William C. Pryor, 88, American jurist, judge (1979–2019) and chief judge (1984–1988) of the District of Columbia Court of Appeals.
André Quilis, 79, French rugby union player (RC Narbonne, national team) and coach.
Harald Ringstorff, 81, German politician.
Khadim Hussain Rizvi, 54, Pakistani Islamic preacher, founder of Tehreek-e-Labbaik Pakistan.
Michal Šafařík, 43, Slovak ice hockey player (HC Slovan Bratislava), traffic collision.
Jake Scott, 75, American football player (Miami Dolphins, Washington Redskins), Super Bowl champion (1973, 1974), Super Bowl MVP (1973), complications from a fall.
Herbert F. Solow, 89, American television producer (Man from Atlantis).
Stan Trafford, 74, English footballer (Port Vale, Macclesfield Town) and cricketer (Staffordshire).
Gennady Zdanovich, 82, Russian archaeologist.

20
Antonio Ambrosetti, 75, Italian mathematician, discoverer of the mountain pass theorem.
Patricia Beatty, 84, Canadian choreographer and dancer.
Jorge Horacio Brito, 68, Argentine banker, CEO of Banco Macro (since 1988), helicopter crash.
Michael Brooks, 85, British music historian and archivist.
Ernesto Canto, 61, Mexican race walker, Olympic champion (1984).
Daniel Cordier, 100, French militant, historian, and art dealer.
Marian Cycoń, 80, Polish politician, deputy (1997–2001, 2011–2015), mayor of Nowy Sącz (1988–1990) and Stary Sącz (1995–1998, 2002–2011).
Jean Darnel, 96–97, French actor and director.
Rudy del Rosario, 51, Filipino football player (Kaya, national team) and manager.
Jacques Déprez, 82, French Olympic hurdler (1960).
Ajay Desai, 63, Indian wildlife expert, cardiac arrest.
Sandy Dvore, 86, American graphic designer, bone cancer.
Mony Elkaïm, 79, Moroccan-Belgian psychiatrist and psychotherapist.
June Furlong, 90, English model.
Tony Gershlick, 69, British cardiologist, COVID-19.
Saverio Imperato, 85, Italian immunologist.
Irinej, 90, Serbian Orthodox prelate, patriarch of the Church (since 2010), COVID-19.
Hannu Lahtinen, 60, Finnish Olympic wrestler (1984), complications from amyotrophic lateral sclerosis.
Jan Morris, 94, Welsh historian (Pax Britannica Trilogy), novelist (Last Letters from Hav) and travel writer.
Murman Omanidze, 82, Georgian politician, acting prime minister (1991), minister of foreign affairs (1991) and MP (1992–1998), COVID-19.
Deb Price, 62, American journalist, pioneering lesbian columnist.
František Reichel, 82, Czech politician, deputy prime minister of Czechoslovakia (1989–1990).
Jos Rosa, 94, Belgian Olympic rower.
John Rowland, 79, English footballer (Nottingham Forest, Port Vale, Mansfield Town).
Albert Salomon, 85, Bulgarian-Israeli accordionist and social activist.
Rita Sargsyan, 58, Armenian music teacher and socialite, first lady (2008–2018), COVID-19.
Ken Schinkel, 87, Canadian ice hockey player (New York Rangers, Pittsburgh Penguins).
Judith Jarvis Thomson, 91, American moral philosopher.
Takao Yaguchi, 81, Japanese manga artist (Fisherman Sanpei), pancreatic cancer.

21
Chen Ailian, 80, Chinese dancer, stomach cancer.
C. K. Bhaskaran, 79, Indian cricketer (Kerala, Madras), cancer.
Dena Dietrich, 91, American actress (Adam's Rib, Friends and Lovers, The Wild Party).
Oliver Friggieri, 73, Maltese poet, writer and philosopher.
Edgar García, 60, Colombian bullfighter, COVID-19.
Robert Garland, 87, American screenwriter (No Way Out, The Electric Horseman, The Big Blue), complications from dementia.
Sandy Harbutt, 79, Australian actor, director and writer. 
Léon Herschtritt, 84, French photographer.
Alvin Holmes, 81, American politician, member of the Alabama House of Representatives (1974–2018).
Htike Zaw, 53, Burmese politician, shot.
Jacques Jurquet, 98, French political activist.
Donal Leace, 81, American singer-songwriter, musician and educator, COVID-19.
Malcolm Marmorstein, 92, American screenwriter and film director (Pete's Dragon, Love Bites, Dark Shadows).
Margaret Nosek, 68, American academic and disability rights activist.
John O'Brien, 75, Irish-American publisher.
Devi Priya, 71, Indian poet and political satirist.
Artemije Radosavljević, 85, Serbian Orthodox prelate, eparch of Raška and Prizren (1991–2010), COVID-19.
Jožef Smej, 98, Slovenian Roman Catholic prelate, auxiliary bishop of Maribor (1983–2009).
Jens Sørensen, 79, Danish Olympic racing cyclist (1960).
Glenn Wilkes, 91, American college basketball coach (Stetson Hatters).
Ricky Yacobi, 57, Indonesian footballer (PSMS Medan, Arseto Solo, national team), heart attack.
Chester Yorton, 81, American bodybuilder, heart attack.

22
Sidi Ould Cheikh Abdallahi, 82, Mauritanian politician, president (2007–2008).
Carlo Ausino, 82, Italian film director (Double Game, Tony: Another Double Game, Don't Look in the Attic) and cinematographer.
Paul Callan, 81, British journalist (Evening Standard, Daily Mail, Daily Mirror), fall.
Anwar Aziz Chaudhry, 89, Pakistani Olympic swimmer (1948) and politician, MP (1988–1990).
Paul Covington, 86, American basketball coach (Jackson State Tigers).
Doris de Agostini, 62, Swiss Olympic alpine skier (1976, 1980).
Khalil el-Moumni, 79, Moroccan imam, COVID-19.
Billy Evans, 88, American basketball player (Kentucky Wildcats), Olympic champion (1956).
Muharrem Fejzo, 87, Albanian film director, set designer and sculptor, COVID-19.
Jimmy Fletcher, 89, English footballer (Dartford).
Gonzalo Galván Castillo, 69, Mexican Roman Catholic prelate, bishop of Autlán (2004–2015).
Honestie Hodges, 14, American police reformer, COVID-19.
Elena Hrenova, 70, Moldovan politician, MP (2014–2019), COVID-19.
Otto Hutter, 96, Austrian-born British physiologist.
Helen LaFrance, 101, American artist.
Lupo, 8, British royal cocker spaniel. (death announced on this date)
David Maas, 57, American magician, circus performer and entertainer, COVID-19.
Hamish MacInnes, 90, Scottish mountaineer. 
Mustafa Nadarević, 77, Bosnian actor (When Father Was Away on Business, The Glembays, Silent Gunpowder) and comedian, lung cancer.
George Nock, 74, American football player (New York Jets, Washington Redskins), COVID-19.
Yuriy Pleshakov, 32, Ukrainian-Russian footballer (Sevastopol, Desna Chernihiv).
Jerrold Post, 86, American psychiatrist and author, COVID-19.
Ray Prosser, 93, Welsh rugby union player (Pontypool, British and Irish Lions, Barbarians).
Patrick Quinn, 37, American disability activist, co-creator of the Ice Bucket Challenge, complications from amyotrophic lateral sclerosis.
Jon Peter Rolie, 74, Norwegian author.
Noëlla Rouget, 100, French resistance member and teacher.
 Badal Roy, 62, Bangladeshi footballer  (Mohammedan, national team), liver cancer.
Maurice Setters, 83, English football player (West Bromwich Albion, Manchester United) and manager (Doncaster Rovers), complications from Alzheimer's disease.
Raimo Tuomela, 80, Finnish philosopher.
Corrie van Gorp, 78, Dutch singer and actress (De Wereld Draait Door).

23
Imoro Andani, Ghanaian royal, Northern Regional minister.
Franco Archibugi, 94, Italian scholar.
Dorothy Gill Barnes, 93, American artist, complications from COVID-19.
Vinicio Bernardini, 94, Italian politician, COVID-19.
Bruce Boynton, 83, American civil rights activist (Freedom Riders, Boynton v. Virginia), cancer.
Tamás Böröndi, 65, Hungarian actor (Szomszédok, Samba), COVID-19.
Vittorio Catani, 80, Italian science fiction writer.
Karl Dall, 79, German actor (Freddy in the Wild West, Hotel Clausewitz, Student of the Bedroom) and comedian, stroke.
Abby Dalton, 88, American actress (Falcon Crest, The Joey Bishop Show, Hennesey).
Hartmut Derendorf, 67, German-American pharmacist, clinical pharmacologist and professor.
David Dinkins, 93, American politician, mayor of New York City (1990–1993), borough president of Manhattan (1986–1989) and member of the New York State Assembly (1966).
Otto Duintjer, 88, Dutch philosopher.
Admir Džubur, 56, Bosnian public utility executive and football administrator, chairman of Željezničar (since 2019), COVID-19.
Marco Virgilio Ferrari, 87, Italian Roman Catholic prelate, auxiliary bishop of Milan (1987–2009), COVID-19.
Konrad Fiałkowski, 80, Polish computer scientist, engineer and science fiction writer.
Jofran Frejat, 83, Brazilian politician, deputy (1987–2003, 2007–2011), lung cancer.
Tarun Gogoi, 84, Indian politician, chief minister of Assam (2011–2016), MP (1971–1984, 1991–1996, 1998–2001) and Assam MLA (1996–1998, since 2001), complications from COVID-19.
Robert Hammerstiel, 87, Austrian painter and engraver.
Klaus Heinrich, 93, German philosopher of religion.
Arthur Hervet, 82, French Roman Catholic priest.
i_o, 30, American disc jockey and music producer, arrhythmia.
Haluk Kakış, 88, Turkish Olympic sailor.
Hal Ketchum, 67, American country singer-songwriter ("Small Town Saturday Night", "Past the Point of Rescue", "Hearts Are Gonna Roll"), complications from dementia.
Yasumi Kobayashi, 58, Japanese science fiction writer, cancer.
Edward Lazear, 72, American economist, pancreatic cancer.
Peter Lichtner-Hoyer, 94, Austrian Olympic equestrian (1956), pentathlete (1960) and colonel.
Édouard Marquis, 51, French television and radio host.
Günther Meier, 79, German Olympic boxer.
Christian Mistral, 56, Canadian novelist, poet and songwriter.
Nikolai Myshagin, 65, Kazakh ice hockey coach (Metallurg Novokuznetsk, Barys Astana, national team).
Anele Ngcongca, 33, South African footballer (FC Fortune, Genk, national team), traffic collision.
John Oldham, 97, American basketball player (Fort Wayne Pistons) and coach (Tennessee Tech Golden Eagles, Western Kentucky Hilltoppers).
Louise Pajo, 80, New Zealand actress (Doctor Who, The Avengers, Prisoner).
Günter Rittner, 93, German painter and illustrator.
David Rogers, 99, English archdeacon.
Józef Rysula, 81, Polish Olympic cross-country skier (1960, 1964, 1968).
Sergei Shmonin, 51, Russian football player (Krylia Sovetov) and executive (Yunit Samara).
Nikola Spasov, 61, Bulgarian football player (Dunav Ruse, Cherno More) and manager (Kaliakra Kavarna), COVID-19.
Viktor Zimin, 58, Russian politician, chairman of the Government of Khakassia (2009–2018), COVID-19.

24
João Alves Filho, 79, Brazilian politician and civil engineer, governor of Sergipe (1983–1987, 1991–1995, 2003–2007) and mayor of Aracaju (1975–1979, 2013–2017), COVID-19.
Rose Marie Battaglia, 91, American Hall of Fame college basketball coach (Bergen Community College, Iona College), lung cancer.
Fasih Bokhari, 78, Pakistani military officer and civil servant, chief of Naval Staff (1997–1999) and chairman of the National Accountability Bureau (2011–2013).
Montserrat Carulla, 90, Spanish actress (Companys, procés a Catalunya, El Cor de la Ciutat, The Orphanage).
Juan de Dios Castro Lozano, 78, Mexican lawyer and politician, president of the Chamber of Deputies (2003–2004) and MP (1979–1985, 1991–2000, 2003–2006), COVID-19.
Yves Vander Cruysen, 57, Belgian historian and politician, COVID-19.
José de Bastos, 91, Portuguese football player (Benfica, Beira-Mar) and manager (Estoril Praia).
Christophe Dominici, 48, French rugby union player (Toulon, Stade Français, national team), fall.
Erik Galimov, 84, Russian geochemist.
Julio César Gandarilla Bermejo, 77, Cuban vice admiral, minister of the interior (since 2017).
Jim Hanifan, 87, American football coach (St. Louis Cardinals) and player (Toronto Argonauts).
Yaroslav Horak, 93, Australian illustrator and comics artist.
Damián Iguacén Borau, 104, Spanish Roman Catholic prelate, bishop of San Cristóbal de La Laguna (1984–1991).
Mohammad Khadem, 85, Iranian Olympic wrestler (1960).
Kambuzia Partovi, 65, Iranian film director (Café Transit, Closed Curtain) and screenwriter (The Circle), COVID-19.
Dorothea G. Petrie, 95, American television producer.
Alan Ramsey, 82, Australian journalist (The Sydney Morning Herald) and speechwriter, complications from dementia.
Mike Reed, 75, Australian politician, MLA (1987–2003), deputy chief minister of the Northern Territory (1995–2001).
Ashiesh Roy, 55, Indian actor (Home Delivery, Raja Natwarlal, Barkhaa), kidney failure.
Harry Ryan, 63, Irish hurler (Kilkenny).
Bob Ryder, 64, American professional wrestling journalist. 
Kalbe Sadiq, 81, Indian Islamic scholar, pneumonia and colorectal cancer.
Fred Sasakamoose, 86, Canadian ice hockey player (Chicago Blackhawks), COVID-19.
Mamadou Tandja, 82, Nigerien politician, president (1999–2010).
Vasil Yakusha, 62, Belarusian rower, Olympic silver (1980) and bronze medallist (1988).
Hussein Al-Zuhairi, Iraqi politician, MP, COVID-19.

25
Marc-André Bédard, 85, Canadian lawyer and politician, deputy premier of Quebec (1984–1985) and Quebec MNA (1973–1985), COVID-19.
Saïd Bouhadja, 82, Algerian politician, president of the People's National Assembly (2017–2018).
Marcello Brunelli, 81, Italian neurophysiologist and academic, complications from COVID-19.
Bob DeWeese, 86, American politician, member of the Kentucky House of Representatives (1993–2016).
Márton Erdős, 76, Hungarian Olympic wrestler.
Cor Geelhuijzen, 91, Dutch footballer (Ajax).
Karl Janetschek, 80, Austrian chess player.
Uriah Adolphus Ashley Maclean, 76, Panamanian Roman Catholic prelate, bishop of Penonomé (1993–2015).
Diego Maradona, 60, Argentine footballer (Barcelona, Napoli, national team), World Cup winner (1986), heart attack.
Duris Maxwell, 74, Canadian drummer.
José Manuel Mireles Valverde, 62, Mexican paramilitary leader, COVID-19.
Ahmad Mukhtar, 74, Pakistani politician, minister of defence (2008–2012) and water and power (2012–2013).
Colin Newell, 47, British television personality (Storage Hunters, Celebrity Big Brother).
William L. Nicholson, 94, American Air Force major general.
Paul Nyman, 91, Finnish Olympic racing cyclist (1952, 1956, 1960).
Ahmed Patel, 71, Indian politician, MP (1977–1989, since 1993), complications from COVID-19.
Markus Paul, 54, American football player (Chicago Bears) and coach (New York Giants, Dallas Cowboys).
Zenon Plech, 67, Polish motorcycle speedway rider.
Alan Powell, 84, New Zealand-born Australian historian.
Jacques Secrétin, 71, French table tennis player, world champion (1977).
Flor Silvestre, 90, Mexican singer ("Cielo rojo"), actress (The Soldiers of Pancho Villa, Ánimas Trujano) and equestrienne.
Robert E. Thacker, 102, American test pilot.
Camilla Wicks, 92, American violinist.
James Wolfensohn, 86, Australian-American banker and Olympic fencer (1956), president of the World Bank Group (1995–2005).

26
Fecó Balázs, 69, Hungarian singer and composer, COVID-19.
Allan Botschinsky, 80, Danish jazz trumpeter.
George H. Carley, 82, American jurist, justice (1993–2012) and chief justice (2012) of the Supreme Court of Georgia, COVID-19.
Fritz Cejka, 92, Austrian footballer (ESV Admira Vienna, Kapfenberger SV, national team).
Athol Kennedy Chase, 84, Australian anthropologist and ethnographer.
Garry Davidson, 66, Australian footballer (Geelong).
Cecilia Fusco, 87, Italian operatic soprano, long illness complicated by COVID-19.
Jamir Garcia, 42, Filipino singer (Slapshock), suicide by hanging.
Vladimir Ivanov, 65, Bulgarian Olympic sprinter (1980), complications from COVID-19.
Benjamín Jiménez Hernández, 82, Mexican Roman Catholic prelate, bishop of Culiacán (1993–2011).
F. C. Kohli, 96, Indian industrialist, founder of Tata Consultancy Services and president of NASSCOM (1995–1996), heart attack.
Dimitar Largov, 84, Bulgarian footballer (Slavia Sofia, national team).
Sadiq al-Mahdi, 84, Sudanese politician and religious leader, prime minister (1966–1967, 1986–1989), COVID-19.
Alfonso Milián Sorribas, 81, Spanish Roman Catholic prelate, bishop of Barbastro-Monzón (2004–2014).
Tevita Momoedonu, 74, Fijian politician, prime minister (2000, 2001).
Daria Nicolodi, 70, Italian actress (Deep Red, Shock) and screenwriter (Suspiria).
Louis Nzala Kianza, 74, Congolese Roman Catholic prelate, bishop of Popokabaka (1996–2020).
Hafez Abu Seada, 55, Egyptian human rights activist, chairman of the Egyptian Organization for Human Rights (since 2004), COVID-19.
Nur Supriyanto, 55, Indonesian politician, MP of West Java (2004–2018, since 2019), COVID-19.
Kamen Tchanev, 56, Bulgarian operatic tenor, COVID-19.
Daniel Michael Tellep, 89, American businessman.
Celestino Vercelli, 74, Italian racing cyclist.
Dadang Wigiarto, 53, Indonesian politician, regent of Situbondo (since 2010), COVID-19.

27
Kevin Burnham, 63, American sailor, Olympic champion (2004) and silver medalist (1992), pulmonary disease.
Selva Casal, 93, Uruguayan poet.
Mohsen Fakhrizadeh, 59, Iranian nuclear scientist, shot.
Gene Fraise, 88, American politician, member of the Iowa Senate (1986–2013), COVID-19.
Tony Hsieh, 46, American internet entrepreneur (Zappos), injuries sustained in a house fire.
Madieng Khary Dieng, 88, Senegalese politician, minister of the interior (1991–1993).
Jin Zhanpeng, 82, Chinese metallurgist, member of the Chinese Academy of Sciences.
Keisuke Kumakiri, 86, Japanese photographer, aspiration pneumonia.
Dainis Liepiņš, 58, Latvian racing cyclist.
Kamel Madoun, Algerian handball player and coach (NA Hussein Dey, Oman Club, national team).
Jim McFarland, 73, American football player (St. Louis Cardinals, Miami Dolphins) and politician, member of the Nebraska Legislature (1986–1991).
Bob Miller, 94, American baseball player (Philadelphia Phillies).
Lou Nistico, 67, Canadian ice hockey player (Toronto Toros, Colorado Rockies).
Dieter Popp, 82, German spy.
Parviz Poorhosseini, 79, Iranian actor (Bashu, the Little Stranger, Saint Mary), COVID-19.
John B. Roe, 78, American politician, myelofibrosis.
Donald Whiston, 90, English footballer (Stoke City, Crewe Alexandra, Rochdale).
Aly Zaker, 76, Bangladeshi actor (Agami, Nodir Naam Modhumoti, Lalsalu), marketing director and writer, COVID-19.

28
Lon Adams, 95, American food scientist, creator of the Slim Jim, complications from COVID-19.
Shams Badran, 91, Egyptian politician, minister of defense (1966–1967).
Hakam Balawi, 82, Palestinian politician, minister of the interior (2003–2005).
Clifton Bertrand, 84, Trinidadian Olympic sprinter (1960, 1964).
Bharat Bhalke, 59–60, Indian politician, complications from COVID-19.
Philippe Clair, 90, French film director (Déclic et des claques, Par où t'es rentré ? On t'a pas vu sortir), actor (Girl on the Road) and screenwriter.
Othella Dallas, 95, American dancer and jazz singer, lung cancer.
Roger Fite, 82, French rugby union player (Cahors Rugby, CA Brive, national team).
Andrea Huser, 46, Swiss mountain biker and triathlete, fall.
Jin Dinghan, 90, Chinese translator.
Ian Jenkins, 67, British archaeologist and curator.
Shahadat Hossain Khan, 62, Bangladeshi sarod player, COVID-19.
Jan Kilian, 66, Polish politician and entrepreneur, member of the Sejm (2015–2019).
Roberto Leitão, 83, Brazilian martial artist, COVID-19.
Sara Leland, 79, American ballet dancer and répétiteur, New York City Ballet principal dancer (1972–1983), congestive heart failure.
Tyler C. Lockett, 87, American jurist, justice of the Kansas Supreme Court (1983–2003), COVID-19.
Roger Mandle, 79, American art curator and academic administrator, president of the Rhode Island School of Design (1993–2008).
David Mordaunt, 83, English cricketer (Sussex).
Basil Moss, 85, British actor (Emergency Ward 10, First Among Equals, David Copperfield).
Vítor Oliveira, 67, Portuguese football player (Portimonense) and manager (Paços de Ferreira, Gil Vicente), heart attack.
Bonifácio Piccinini, 91, Brazilian Roman Catholic prelate, archbishop of Cuiabá (1981–2004).
Maria Piechotka, 100, Polish architect and politician, member of the Sejm (1961–1965).
David Prowse, 85, English actor (Star Wars, A Clockwork Orange, Jabberwocky) and bodybuilder, complications from COVID-19.
Peter Radtke, 77, German actor and playwright.
Juan de Dios Román, 77, Spanish handball coach (Atlético Madrid BM, BM Ciudad Real, national team) and president of the RFEBM (2008–2013), stroke.
Anneliese Seonbuchner, 91, German Olympic hurdler (1952).
Jean-Louis Servan-Schreiber, 83, French journalist, COVID-19.
Pearl Sullivan, 59, Malaysian-Canadian engineer, cancer.
Jean Tavernier, 92, French politician.
Wendy Weir, 72, Australian cricketer, cancer.
Marvin Westmore, 85, American makeup artist (Blade Runner, The Best Little Whorehouse in Texas, Escape from L.A.).

29
Miša Aleksić, 67, Serbian rock bassist (Riblja Čorba), complications from COVID-19.
Sahibzada Farooq Ali, 89, Pakistani politician, speaker of the National Assembly (1973–1977).
José Rafael Barquero Arce, 89, Costa Rican Roman Catholic prelate, auxiliary bishop of Alajuela (1980–2007).
Ben Bova, 88, American science fiction writer (Grand Tour), complications from COVID-19 and a stroke.
Edda Bresciani, 90, Italian Egyptologist.
Marco Dino Brogi, 88, Italian Roman Catholic prelate, apostolic nuncio to Egypt and delegate to the Arab League (2002–2006), COVID-19.
Tom Casperson, 61, American politician, member of the Michigan House of Representatives (2003–2008) and Senate (2011–2018), lung cancer.
Mary R. Dawson, 89, American vertebrate paleontologist and museum curator (Carnegie Museum of Natural History), heart failure.
Papa Bouba Diop, 42, Senegalese footballer (Fulham, Portsmouth, national team), complications from amyotrophic lateral sclerosis.
Philip Dulhunty, 96, Australian aviator, aspiration pneumonia.
Jack Foley, 81, American basketball player (Holy Cross Crusaders, Boston Celtics, New York Knicks).
Vladimir Fortov, 74, Russian physicist, member of the Russian Academy of Sciences, COVID-19.
Ernesto Galli, 75, Italian football player and coach (Lanerossi Vicenza), COVID-19.
Sam Herman, 84, British glass artist.
Siegfried Hug, 84, German Olympic cross-country skier (1960).
Senga McCrone, 86, Scottish bowler.
Joe Mooney, 90, American stadium groundskeeper (Boston Red Sox).
Giorgio Morales, 88, Italian politician, mayor of Florence (1989–1995), pneumonia.
Peg Murray, 96, American actress (Cabaret), Tony winner (1967).
April Boy Regino, 59, Filipino musician and actor, chronic kidney disease.
John Sedgley, 81, English cricketer (Worcestershire).
Remo Sernagiotto, 65, Italian politician, MEP (2014–2019), heart attack.
Ali-Asghar Shahbazi, 98, Iranian actor (A Separation), cardiac arrest.
Suh Se-ok, 91, South Korean painter.
Nedal Abu Tabaq, 49, Polish-Palestinian imam and doctor, COVID-19.
Viorel Turcu, 60, Romanian footballer (Argeș Pitești, Steaua București, national team), heart attack.
Ayhan Ulubelen, 89, Turkish analytical chemist, COVID-19.
Richard C. West, 76, American librarian and Tolkien scholar, COVID-19.

30
Miguel Algarín, 79, Puerto Rican writer, co-founder of the Nuyorican Poets Cafe.
Sheetal Amte, 39, Indian social worker, suicide.
Irina Antonova, 98, Russian art historian, complications from COVID-19.
Herman van Bekkum, 88, Dutch chemist.
Dee Benson, 72, American jurist, judge (since 1991) and chief judge (1999–2006) of the U.S. District Court for Utah, brain cancer.
Eddie Benton-Banai, 89, American civil rights activist (American Indian Movement).
Betty Bobbitt, 81, American-born Australian actress (Prisoner, Crocodile Dundee II, Crocodile Dundee in Los Angeles), stroke.
Hella Brock, 101, German music educator and musicologist, COVID-19.
Vishwa Nath Datta, 94, Indian historian.
Ross Dykes, 75, New Zealand cricketer (Auckland).
Lorenzo Fernández, 81, Cuban baseball player (Baltimore Orioles).
Guido Goldman, 83, American political scientist.
Bruce Herschensohn, 88, American political commentator.
Liliane Juchli, 87, Swiss nurse and author, COVID-19.
Kiran Maheshwari, 59, Indian politician, MP (2004–2009), COVID-19.
David Mills, 94, Canadian bass singer and poet.
José María Palomo, 74, Spanish Olympic bobsledder.
Branimir Šćepanović, 83, Serbian writer. 
Aleksandr Shatskikh, 46, Kazakh football player (Kainar, national team) and manager.
Muhammad Adil Siddiqui, 57, Pakistani politician, Sindh MPA (2013–2018), COVID-19.
Anne Sylvestre, 86, French singer-songwriter.
Tan Eng Bock, 84, Singaporean Olympic water polo player (1956), stroke.

References

2020-11
 11